Just One Look is a 2004 novel by Harlan Coben. It is considered his sixth stand-alone novel, but does contain at least one reference to his Myron Bolitar series.  The plot centers on a woman whose whole life changes one day upon her taking home a set of pictures, and finding one that does not belong.

Plot summary
After picking up her two young children from school, Grace Lawson looks through a newly developed set of photographs. She finds an odd one in the pack: a mysterious picture from perhaps twenty years ago, showing four strangers she can't identify. But there is one face she recognizes—that of her husband, from before she knew him. When her husband sees the photo that night, he leaves their home and drives off without explanation. She doesn't know where he's going, why he's leaving, or whether or not he's ever coming back. Nor does she realize how dangerous the search for him will be. There are others interested in both her husband's past and that photo, including Eric Wu, a fierce, silent killer who will not be stopped from finding his quarry, no matter who or what stands in his way.
Her world turned upside down, filled with doubts about her herself and marriage, Grace must confront the dark corners of her own tragic past as she struggles to learn the truth, find her husband, and save her family.

TV Adaptation
Following the success of their adaptation of No Second Chance, French TV channel TF1 commissioned a mini-series based on Just One Look, which premiered in June 2017 in Switzerland (RTS Un), Belgium & Luxembourg (RTL-TVI) and France, Monaco & Andorra (TF1).

Like prior French adaptations, the series shifts the action to France. It stars Virginie Ledoyen as the lead, renamed Eva Beaufils, and Thierry Neuvic as her husband.

2004 American novels
Novels by Harlan Coben
Dutton Penguin books
American crime novels
American thriller novels
American novels adapted into television shows